The Eyre River is a river in the Canterbury region of New Zealand. It arises in the Puketeraki Range and flows south-east into the Waimakariri River near Christchurch International Airport. The connection with the Waimakariri is via a diversion channel running south-west, replacing the Eyre's original easterly flow. The river is named after Edward John Eyre, the Lieutenant-Governor of New Munster from 1848 to 1853.

The river rarely carries surface water, due to the unreliability of the easterly rains which feed it.

See also
List of rivers of New Zealand

References

Land Information New Zealand - Search for Place Names

Rivers of Canterbury, New Zealand
Rivers of New Zealand